Richard W. Butler is a retired aviator and officer in the United States Navy.

He was the commandant of Joint Task Force Guantanamo from July 2013 to July 2014.

Butler went on record as supporting President Barack Obama's plan to close the detention camp.

Butler later served as the commanding officer of Carrier Strike Group 4 before retiring from active duty in 2016.

Earlier in his career, Butler commanded Strike Fighter Squadron 25 and Carrier Air Wing 14.

Butler is a 1982 graduate of the University of Kentucky. He later earned a master's degree from the National War College.

References

External links

1959 births
Living people
Place of birth missing (living people)
University of Kentucky alumni
United States Naval Aviators
National War College alumni
Recipients of the Legion of Merit
United States Navy admirals